Sigela basipunctaria, the spotted sigela moth, is a species of moth in the family Erebidae. It is found in North America.

The MONA or Hodges number for Sigela basipunctaria is 8434.

References

Further reading

 
 
 

Scolecocampinae
Articles created by Qbugbot
Moths described in 1861